Follansbee is a city in Brooke County, West Virginia, United States, located along the Ohio River. The population was 2,853 at the 2020 census, a decrease from 2,986 at the 2010 census. It is part of the Weirton–Steubenville metropolitan area. The city was named after the Follansbee brothers, the proprietors of a local steel mill.

Geography
Follansbee is located at  (40.332919, -80.594048).

Demographics

2010 census
As of the census of 2010, there were 2,986 people, 1,302 households, and 842 families living in the city. The racial makeup of the city was 97.6% White, 0.3% African American, 0.1% Native American, 0.2% Asian, 0.2% from other races, and 1.5% from two or more races. Hispanic or Latino of any race were 0.7% of the population.

There were 1,302 households, of which 27.0% had children under the age of 18 living with them, 46.1% were married couples living together, 13.1% had a female householder with no husband present, 5.5% had a male householder with no wife present, and 35.3% were non-families. 30.6% of all households were made up of individuals, and 14.1% had someone living alone who was 65 years of age or older. The average household size was 2.29 and the average family size was 2.85.

The median age in the city was 44.6 years. 20.7% of residents were under the age of 18; 7.7% were between the ages of 18 and 24; 22.1% were from 25 to 44; 30.9% were from 45 to 64; and 18.7% were 65 years of age or older. The gender makeup of the city was 47.4% male and 52.6% female.

2000 census
As of the census of 2000, there were 3,115 people, 1,340 households, and 911 families living in the city. The population density was 1,757.9 people per square mile (679.5/km2). There were 1,453 housing units at an average density of 820.0 per square mile (317.0/km2). The racial makeup of the city was 98.97% White, 0.06% African American, 0.06% Native American, 0.32% Asian, 0.03% from other races, and 0.55% from two or more races. Hispanic or Latino of any race were 0.26% of the population.

There were 1,340 households, out of which 26.4% had children under the age of 18 living with them, 50.6% were married couples living together, 13.0% had a female householder with no husband present, and 32.0% were non-families. 29.2% of all households were made up of individuals, and 16.3% had someone living alone who was 65 years of age or older. The average household size was 2.32 and the average family size was 2.86.

In the city the age distribution of the population shows 21.3% under the age of 18, 7.4% from 18 to 24, 24.8% from 25 to 44, 26.2% from 45 to 64, and 20.4% who were 65 years of age or older. The median age was 43 years. For every 100 females, there were 90.1 males. For every 100 females age 18 and over, there were 88.0 males.

The median income for a household in the city was $30,818, and the median income for a family was $37,679. Males had a median income of $36,063 versus $19,554 for females. The per capita income for the city was $16,824. About 11.6% of families and 12.8% of the population were below the poverty line, including 21.4% of those under age 18 and 8.2% of those age 65 or over.

See also
 List of cities and towns along the Ohio River

Notable people
 Glenn Davis, Olympic hurdler and sprinter who won a total of three gold medals in the 1956 and 1960 Olympic Games (born in Follansbee)
 Anthony di Bonaventura, U.S. concert pianist and pedagogue
 Lou Holtz, former NCAA and NFL football coach (born in Follansbee)

References

External links

Cities in Brooke County, West Virginia
West Virginia populated places on the Ohio River
Cities in West Virginia